"They Like It Slow" is a song performed by H-Town, issued as the only single from their third album Ladies Edition, Woman's World. The song was written by group members Dino and Shazam Conner, and it was the last song the group released before Dino Conner was killed in a car accident. The song is also the group's last entry to date on the Billboard Hot 100, peaking at #35 in 1997.

Charts

Weekly charts

Year-end charts

References

1997 singles
H-Town (band) songs
Relativity Records singles
1997 songs